Hangar 18 was an American hip hop group from New York City, New York. It consisted of Alaska, Windnbreeze, and DJ Pawl. The group was signed to Definitive Jux.

History
During their early years, Alaska and Windnbreeze were active members of the Atoms Family crew. Hangar 18 was formed after the two were joined by DJ Pawl in 2002. The group's name derives from a hangar at the Wright-Patterson Air Force Base in Ohio.

In 2004, Hangar 18 released the debut studio album, The Multi-Platinum Debut Album, on Definitive Jux. It received favorable reviews from Exclaim! and XLR8R. In 2007, the group released the second studio album, Sweep the Leg, on the label. It featured a guest appearance from Slug of Atmosphere.

Members
 Alaska - rapper
 Windnbreeze - rapper
 DJ Pawl - producer, DJ

Discography

Studio albums
 The Multi-Platinum Debut Album (2004)
 Sweep the Leg (2007)

Compilation albums
 The Shameless Self-Promotion CD (2003)
 The Donkey Show Volume 1 (2005)

Singles
 "Where We At?" / "Hangar 18 and the Temple of Doom" (2003)
 "Beatslope" (2004)
 "Barhoppin'" (2004)

Guest appearances
 Rob Sonic - "Sniper Picnic" from Telicatessen (2004)
 Dub-L - "World Premier" from Day of the Mega Beast! (2004)
 Fred Ones - "Evolve" from Phobia of Doors (2004)

References

Further reading

External links
 
 

American hip hop groups
Definitive Jux artists
Musical groups from New York City